Sir Augustus William Lawson Hemming  (2 September 1841 – 27 March 1907) was a British colonial administrator, who served as governor of a number of colonies, including British Guiana (1896–1898) and Jamaica (1898–1904).

In April 1902, Sir Augustus Hemming (as governor of Jamaica) and Lady Hemming visited Cuba as guests of Military Governor Leonard Wood. Later the same year he opened an extension to the Constant Spring Hotel, promoting increased tourism to the island.

Hemming was also a first-class cricketer. He played six first-class matches: five for various teams in England between 1866 and 1878, and one in 1902 when he was Governor of Jamaica and aged 60.

References

1841 births
1907 deaths
Governors of British Guiana
Governors of Jamaica
English cricketers
Marylebone Cricket Club cricketers
Gentlemen of the South cricketers
Southgate cricketers
Knights Grand Cross of the Order of St Michael and St George
R. D. Walker's XI cricketers